The Lamiaceae
or Labiatae are a family of flowering plants commonly known as the mint, deadnettle or sage family. Many of the plants are aromatic in all parts and include widely used culinary herbs like basil, mint, rosemary, sage, savory, marjoram, oregano, hyssop, thyme, lavender, and perilla, as well as other medicinal herbs such as catnip, salvia, bee balm, wild dagga, and oriental motherwort. Some species are shrubs, trees (such as teak), or, rarely, vines.  Many members of the family are widely cultivated, not only for their aromatic qualities, but also their ease of cultivation, since they are readily propagated by stem cuttings. Besides those grown for their edible leaves, some are grown for decorative foliage. Others are grown for seed, such as Salvia hispanica (chia), or for their edible tubers, such as Plectranthus edulis, Plectranthus esculentus, Plectranthus rotundifolius, and Stachys affinis (Chinese artichoke). Many are also grown ornamentally, notably coleus, Plectranthus, and many Salvia species and hybrids.

The family has a cosmopolitan distribution. The enlarged Lamiaceae contain about 236 genera and have been stated to contain 6,900 to 7,200 species, but the World Checklist lists 7,534. The largest genera are Salvia (900), Scutellaria (360), Stachys (300), Plectranthus (300), Hyptis (280), Teucrium (250), Vitex (250), Thymus (220), and Nepeta (200). Clerodendrum was once a genus of over 400 species, but by 2010, it had been narrowed to about 150.

The family has traditionally been considered closely related to the Verbenaceae;  in the 1990s, phylogenetic studies suggested that many genera classified in the Verbenaceae should be classified in the Lamiaceae  or to other families in the order Lamiales.

The alternative family name Labiatae refers to the flowers typically having petals fused into an upper lip and a lower lip ( in Latin). The flowers are bilaterally symmetrical with five united petals and five united sepals. They are usually bisexual and verticillastrate (a flower cluster that looks like a whorl of flowers, but actually consists of two crowded clusters). Although this is still considered an acceptable alternative name, most botanists now use the name Lamiaceae in referring to this family. The leaves emerge oppositely, each pair at right angles to the previous one (decussate) or whorled. The stems are frequently square in cross section, but this is not found in all members of the family, and is sometimes found in other plant families.

Genera 

The last revision of the entire family was published in 2004. It described and provided keys to 236 genera. These are marked with an asterisk (*) in the list below. A few genera have been established or resurrected since 2004. These are marked with a plus sign (+). Other genera have been synonymised. These are marked with a minus sign (-). The remaining genera in the list are mostly of historical interest only and are from a source that includes such genera without explanation. Few of these are recognized in modern treatments of the family.

Kew Gardens provides a list of genera that includes additional information. A list at the Angiosperm Phylogeny Website is frequently updated.

Recent changes 

The circumscription of several genera has changed since 2004. Tsoongia, Paravitex, and Viticipremna have been sunk into synonymy with Vitex. Huxleya has been sunk into Volkameria. Kalaharia, Volkameria, Ovieda, and Tetraclea have been segregated from a formerly polyphyletic Clerodendrum. Rydingia has been separated from Leucas. The remaining Leucas is paraphyletic over four other genera.

Subfamilies and tribes 

In 2004, the Lamiaceae were divided into seven subfamilies, plus 10 genera not placed in any of the subfamilies. The unplaced genera are: Tectona, Callicarpa, Hymenopyramis, Petraeovitex, Peronema, Garrettia, Cymaria, Acrymia, Holocheila, and Ombrocharis. The subfamilies are the Symphorematoideae, Viticoideae, Ajugoideae, Prostantheroideae, Nepetoideae, Scutellarioideae, and Lamioideae. The subfamily Viticoideae is probably not monophyletic. The Prostantheroideae and Nepetoideae are divided into tribes. These are shown in the phylogenetic tree below.

Phylogeny 

Most of the genera of Lamiaceae have never been sampled for DNA for molecular phylogenetic studies. Most of those that have been are included in the following phylogenetic tree. The phylogeny depicted below is based on seven different sources.

References

External links 

 Lamiaceae in L. Watson and M.J. Dallwitz (1992 onwards). The families of flowering plants: descriptions, illustrations, identification, information retrieval. https://delta-intkey.com

 
Lamiales families